Rashed Rahman is the former editor of one of Pakistan's major English language newspapers, the Daily Times. He served as the editor from 2009 – November 2015.

Early life and career

Rashed Rahman qualified as a Chartered accountant from England and Wales and later decided to take up journalism as career. He has formerly been the executive editor of English dailies published from Pakistan - The Post, The Nation (Pakistan) and Daily Times (Pakistan). Rashed Rahman is a seasoned journalist and a veteran leftist political campaigner.
As editor of Daily Times newspaper, he used to protect his reporters and columnists from the external interference.

In November 2017, Rashed Rahman writes as a columnist for Dawn Group of Newspapers.

References

Living people
Pakistani male journalists
Pakistani columnists
Pakistani newspaper editors
Year of birth missing (living people)
St. Anthony's High School, Lahore alumni
Dawn Media Group people